Brigadier-General Sir William Bromley-Davenport,  (21 January 1862 – 6 February 1949) was a British soldier, footballer and Conservative politician. He fought with distinction in both the Second Boer War and the First World War. An MP from 1886 to 1906, he held political office under Arthur Balfour as Financial Secretary to the War Office from 1903 to 1905.

Background and education
Bromley-Davenport was the son of William Bromley Davenport and his wife Augusta Elizabeth Campbell, daughter of Walter Campbell, of Islay. He was educated at Eton and Balliol College, Oxford.

Footballing career
Bromley-Davenport played football for Oxford University and Old Etonians. He represented England on two occasions in March 1884, against Scotland and Wales respectively. A centre-forward, he scored two goals in the game against Wales.

Political and military career
Bromley-Davenport was elected Member of Parliament for Macclesfield in the July 1886 general election. He was appointed a captain in the Staffordshire Yeomanry on 30 December 1891, and received the honorary rank of major on 28 February 1900. While an MP, he fought in the Second Boer War with the Imperial Yeomanry, where he was awarded the Distinguished Service Order (DSO) in November 1900. At the end of 1901, he was appointed a Deputy Lieutenant of Cheshire. He served in the Conservative administration of Arthur Balfour as Financial Secretary to the War Office from 1903 to 1905 and was a Civil Member of the Army Council from 1904 to 1905. However, he lost his seat in the House of Commons in the 1906 Liberal landslide.

During the First World War Bromley-Davenport commanded the 22nd Mounted Brigade of the Egyptian Expeditionary Force with the rank of Brigadier-General from 1916 to 1917. He was also Assistant Director of Labour from 1917 to 1918. Between 1920 and 1949 he held the honorary post of Lord-Lieutenant of Cheshire. He was made a Companion of the Order of St Michael and St George (CMG) in 1918, a Commander of the Order of the British Empire (CBE) in 1919 and a Knight Commander of the Order of the Bath (KCB) in 1924.

Personal life
Bromley-Davenport's seat was Capesthorne Hall, Cheshire. He died unmarried in February 1949, aged 87.

References

External links 

1862 births
1949 deaths
People educated at Eton College
Alumni of Balliol College, Oxford
Deputy Lieutenants of Cheshire
English footballers
England international footballers
Oxford University A.F.C. players
British Army cavalry generals of World War I
British Army personnel of the Second Boer War
Knights Commander of the Order of the Bath
Companions of the Order of St Michael and St George
Commanders of the Order of the British Empire
Companions of the Distinguished Service Order
Lord-Lieutenants of Cheshire
Conservative Party (UK) MPs for English constituencies
UK MPs 1886–1892
UK MPs 1892–1895
UK MPs 1895–1900
UK MPs 1900–1906
Imperial Yeomanry officers
Association football forwards
British sportsperson-politicians